The Annunciation is a 157 by 315 cm fresco fragment by Correggio, dating to around 1524-1525 and now in the Galleria nazionale di Parma.

History
It was originally painted on the wall of the church of San Francesco in Parma. Its style allows it to be dated to the 1520s, shortly after Correggio finished the frescoes on the dome of the church of San Giovanni Evangelista and just before he began those on the dome of Parma Cathedral. The figure of Gabriel on a cloud with his robe blown in the wind is reminiscent of Correggio's work on these other two frescoes

On San Francesco's demolition in 1546 was moved to another location, where it was seen by Vasari:
 
It was later moved a second time, to the Annunziata church in Capo di Ponto.

References

Bibliography 
  Lucia Fornari Schianchi (ed.), Correggio, Skira, Milano, 2008.  (exhibition catalogue for the 2008-2009 exhibition in Parma; with bibliography)
 David Ekserdjan, Correggio, Amilcare Pizzi, Milano, 1997.

Church frescos in Italy
Fresco paintings by Correggio
Correggio
1525 paintings
Collections of the Galleria nazionale di Parma